Andrea Rosso may refer to:
 Andrea Rosso (footballer)
 Andrea Rosso (racing driver)